Rao Bahadur Vishnu Moreshwar Mahajani (Marathi: विष्णु मोरेश्वर महाजनी) (12 November 1851 – 16 February 1923) was a Marathi poet and playwright from Maharashtra, India.

Biography
Mahajani was born on 12 November 1851 in Pune. He studied at Deccan College in Pune to receive his master's degree in 1873. He then served for a few years as a teacher in Akola. He was awarded Rao Bahadur in 1913.

The liberal views of Justice Mahadev Govind Ranade had highly influenced Mahajani's thinking. He used to attend several meetings of Prarthana Samaj, where abhang of  Sant Tukaram would often be recited. The recitations developed his deep interest in the works of Tukaram. In 1902, he delivered lectures on the works of Tukaram at the Hemantotsav Vyakhanmala in Mumbai. Later he translated 900 Marathi abhang of Sant Tukaram into English. (They remain unpublished.)

Mahajani wrote 12 Marathi books which comprise plays and collections of his poems, the latter including translations of some English poems. (Three of Mahajani's works remain unpublished.)

He chaired  Regional Social Conference, a conference related with conference of Indian National Congress, held in Dharwad in 1903.

He chaired in 1907 Marathi Sahitya Sammelan held in Pune.

References

 Vishnu Moreshwar Mahajani - Vykati Ani Vangmay :  Biography by Pushpa Limaye

Marathi-language writers
1851 births
1923 deaths
Writers from Pune
Marathi people
Rai Bahadurs
Poets from Maharashtra
19th-century Indian poets
20th-century Indian poets
20th-century Indian translators
Presidents of the Akhil Bharatiya Marathi Sahitya Sammelan
19th-century translators